The Alabama Crimson Tide women's soccer team is an intercollegiate varsity team representing the University of Alabama. The Alabama Crimson Tide competes in Division I of the National Collegiate Athletics Association (NCAA) and in the Southeastern Conference (SEC). Home games are played at the Alabama Soccer Stadium on the University of Alabama campus.  Wes Hart is the current head coach of the Crimson Tide, a position he has occupied since 2015.

History
The inaugural season for women's soccer at the University of Alabama was in 1986, with Janko Emedi being the program's first coach.  In the program's second year of existence with Coach Emedi, a winning record of 9–4–1 was achieved.  Soccer at the university was absent between 1989 and 1993, until Don Staley was hired as head coach in 1994 to re-establish a soccer program at the University of Alabama. The University of Alabama Soccer Field hosted its first soccer match on October 2, 1994, against Furman University.  In 2004, the team moved to the new Alabama Soccer Complex.  The Crimson Tide welcomed a new coach in 2008, when Todd Bramble was hired. Bramble resigned in 2015 and was replaced by Wes Hart.

Current Roster

Coaching staff
Wes Hart is the current head coach of the Crimson Tide. He joined the staff on April 9, 2015.

Home Stadium
The Alabama Soccer Stadium was built in 2008.  The stadium features a high-definition scoreboard that was transferred from Bryant–Denny Stadium.  Unique among collegiate soccer stadiums, the large-sized scoreboard at the Alabama Soccer Stadium provides graphics for player introductions, game replays, and customized videos.  Its seating capacity is 1,500.

Seasons

Player Achievements

References

External links
 Official site
 Media guide

 
NCAA Division I women's soccer teams